Comic Relief is a United Kingdom charity for the needy.

Comic Relief may also refer to:
Comic relief, the comedic term.
Comic Relief, Inc., a United States charity working to break the cycle of poverty.
Comic Relief USA, a defunct United States charity for the homeless.
Comic Relief (retailer), a former comic book retail store run by Rory Root in Berkeley, California.
"Comic Relief", a 2001 episode of Dexter's Laboratory.

See also